Integrin beta-1 (ITGB1), also known as CD29, is a cell surface receptor that in humans is encoded by the ITGB1 gene. This integrin associates with integrin alpha 1 and integrin alpha 2 to form integrin complexes which function as collagen receptors. It also forms dimers with integrin alpha 3 to form integrin receptors for netrin 1 and reelin. These and other integrin beta 1 complexes have been historically known as very late activation (VLA) antigens.

Integrin beta 1 is expressed as at least four different isoforms. In cardiac muscle and skeletal muscle, the integrin beta-1D isoform is specifically expressed, and localizes to costameres, where it aids in the lateral force transmission from the Z-discs to the extracellular matrix. Abnormal levels of integrin beta-1D have been found in limb girdle muscular dystrophy and polyneuropathy.

Structure 

Integrin beta-1 can exist as different isoforms via alternative splicing. Six alternatively spliced variants have been found for this gene which encode five proteins with alternate C-termini. Integrin receptors exist as heterodimers, and greater than 20 different integrin heterodimeric receptors have been described. All integrins, alpha and beta forms, have large extracellular and short intracellular domains. The cytoplasmic domain of integrin beta-1 binds to the actin cytoskeleton. Integrin beta-1 is the most abundant beta-integrin expressed and associates with at least 10 different integrin-alpha subunits.

Function 

Integrin family members are membrane receptors involved in cell adhesion and recognition in a variety of processes including embryogenesis, hemostasis, tissue repair, immune response and metastatic diffusion of tumor cells. Integrins link the actin cytoskeleton with the extracellular matrix and they transmit signals bidirectionally between the extracellular matrix and cytoplasmic domains.
Beta-integrins are primarily responsible for targeting integrin dimers to the appropriate subcellular locations, which in adhesive cells is mainly focal adhesions. Integrin beta-1 mutants lose the ability to target to sites of focal adhesions.

Three novel isoforms of integrin beta-1 have been identified, termed beta-1B, beta-1C and beta-1D. Integrin beta-1B is transcribed when the proximal 26 amino acids of the cytoplasmic domain in exon 6 are retained and then succeeded by a 12 amino acid stretch from an adjacent intronic region. The integrin beta-1B isoform appears to act as a dominant negative in that it inhibits cell adhesion. A second integrin beta-1 isoform, termed beta-1C, was described to have an additional 48 amino acids appended to the 26 amino acids in the cytoplasmic domain; the function of this isoform was an inhibitory one on DNA synthesis in the G1 phase of the cell cycle.  The third isoform, termed beta-1D, is a striated muscle-specific isoform, which replaces the canonical beta-1A isoform in cardiac and skeletal muscle cells. This isoform is produced from splicing into a novel additional exon between exons 6 and 7. The cytoplasmic domain of integrin beta-1D replaces the distal 21 amino acids (present in integrin beta-1A) with an alternative stretch of 24 amino acids (13 unique).

Integrin beta-1D appears to be developmentally regulated during myofibrilogenesis, appearing immediately following the fusion of myoblasts in C2C12 cell with rising levels throughout myofibrillar differentiation. Integrin beta-1D is specifically localized to costameres and intercalated discs of cardiac muscle and costameres, myotendinous junctions and neuromuscular junctions of skeletal muscle, and it appears to function in general like other integrins, as the clustering of beta-1D integrins on the surface of CHO cells resulted in tyrosine phosphorylation of pp125FAK and induced mitogen-activated protein kinase activation.

Clinical significance
In patients with limb girdle muscular dystrophy, type 2C, beta-1D integrin has been shown to be severely reduced in skeletal muscle biopsies, coordinate with a reduction in alpha 7B-integrin and filamin 2.

In patients with sensitive-motor polyneuropathy, levels of integrin alpha-7B, integrin beta-1D and agrin were significantly reduced nearly to undetectable levels; and this corresponded with lower mRNA levels.

Interactions 

CD29 has been shown to interact with 

 ACTN1;
 CD46, 
 CD9,
 FHL2, 
 Filamin,
 FLNB,
 CD81, 
 GNB2L1,
 ITGB1BP1, 
 LGALS8,  
 MAP4K4, 
 NME1, 
 PKC alpha, 
 TLN1,
 TSPAN4, and
 YWHAB.

References

Further reading

External links 
 
 

Integrins
Clusters of differentiation